Ungheni is a district in the central part of Moldova, bordering Romania, with the administrative center at Ungheni. The other major city is Corneşti. As of 1 January 2011, its population was 117,400.

History

Villages with ancient historical credentials are Buciumeni, Busila and Ungheni, they are documented in the period 1428–1430. About noble families who ruled the territory known as follows: the 1462 Pan Bratul, Procelnic's son, reigned here. This Procelnic was Stoian, advice nobleman in the reign of Alexander the Good, and participant in the Battle of Grunwald in 1422. Other relatives of the warrior, master settlement in 1490, until the 17th century. Beginning with the reign of Vasile Lupu, his cousin, marshal Iorga, buy here parts of estates. After his death he bequeathed to the village of his sisters Alexandra and Creata. Their life in Ungheni died in the late 18th century. In 1812 the Treaty of Bucharest, Basarabia is occupied by the Russian Empire at this time (1812–1917), has an intense russification of the native population. In 1876–1877 is built spotted Prut between Ungheni (Moldova) and common Ungheni (Romania) Eiffel Bridge, designed by Gustave Eiffel, the creator of the Eiffel Tower in Paris, Gustave Eiffel in this period, visit Ungheni. In 1918 after the collapse of the Russian Empire, Basarabia joins the motherland Romania, in this period (1918–1940, 1941–1944) is part of the Iași County. In 1940 after Molotov-Ribbentrop Treaty, Bessarabia is occupied by the USSR. In 1991 as a result of the proclamation of Independence of Moldova, part and residence of the Ungheni County (1991–2003), and in 2003 became administrative unit of Moldova.

Geography
Ungheni district is located in central part of the Republic of Moldova. It borders in north with Falesti and Singerei district, east Telenesti and Calarasi districts, in southeast Nisporeni District and has state border with Romania over a distance of 80 km. Terrain, slippery due to the Central Moldavian Plateau, west along the Prut River valley is a depression that is Ungheni. Just district is located in the woodlands, Codri. Soil chernozems (75%) in valleys and plains and brown soil on the plateau. The highest point of the district is Veverița Hill, 408 meters.

Climate
Temperate continental climate. The average annual temperature +9.0+9.5 C, average temperature 21 C July, the average temperature in January −4.5 C. Annual precipitation 500–650 mm. Average wind speed 3–5 m \ s.

Fauna
Animal fauna characterized by: fox, wild boar, wolf, deer, red deer, raccoon dog, hedgehog, badger, wild cat and others. Of birds: hawk, stork, egret, partridges, crow, tits, sparrows and others.

Flora
Forests occupy 26.6% area of the district, are characterized by oak, beech, hornbeam, maple, acacia, lime and others. From plants: clover, black, fescue, mugwort, nettle and others.

Rivers
District is located in the basin of the Prut River, crossed the Prut in west of district, the border with Romania over a distance of 80 km. The main tributary is Delia. Are 132 ponds. For rural areas groundwater is the main source of household drinking water. They come to the surface through wells 6170 (70 fountains) and 67 springs. Most are kept and landscaped.

Administrative subdivisions
Localities: 74
Administrative center: Ungheni
Cities: Cornesti, Ungheni
Communes: 31
Villages: 41

Demographics
1 January 2012 the district population was 117,200 of which 34.5% urban and 65.5% rural population

Births (2010): 1517 (12.9 per 1000)
Deaths (2010): 1417 (12.1 per 1000)
Growth Rate (2010): 100 (0.8 per 1000)

Ethnic groups 

Footnote: * There is an ongoing controversy regarding the ethnic identification of Moldovans and Romanians.

Religion 
Christians – 98.2%
Orthodox Christians – 97.0%
Protestant – 1.2%
Baptists – 0.9%
Seventh-day Adventists – 0.2%
Evangelicals – 0.1%
Other – 1.1%
No Religion – 0.6%
Atheists – 0.1%

Economy
Currently over 16,600 businesses are registered. After legal form a share is the great farms, individual companies and limited liability companies. Agricultural land is 49,970.8 ha (46.1%) of total land area. Arable land is 45,181.3 ha (41.7%) of the total agricultural land, of which: plantations of orchards – 2951.7 ha (2.7%), vineyards – 1534.1 (1.4%) ha. The main crops are: cereals (wheat, oats), corn, sunflower, rapeseed and soy.

Industry
Processing industry of agricultural production is represented by companies that process raw material milling units, bakery and compound feed in enterprises producing meat products, canned fruit and vegetables, alcoholic beverages and soft drinks. A share of 80% in industry in district, has fiber preparation, spinning, carpet and rugs.

District is traditional for the production of ceramic. At activates Ungheni over half a century artistic ceramics factory.

Telecommunications
Telecommunications and information sources is an area that every year more and progress records. Diversity and quality of these services has increased considerably. The banking system is represented by 11 branches of banks in Moldova.

Politics
In terms of political and electoral, Ungheni district said the center-right parties in Moldova represented by the AEI. While the PCRM is in a continuous fall.

During the last three elections AEI had an increase of 79.5%

Elections

|-
!style="background-color:#E9E9E9" align=center colspan="2" valign=center|Parties and coalitions
!style="background-color:#E9E9E9" align=right|Votes
!style="background-color:#E9E9E9" align=right|%
!style="background-color:#E9E9E9" align=right|+/−
|-
| 
|align=left|Party of Communists of the Republic of Moldova
|align="right"|21,535
|align="right"|42.35
|align="right"|−4.33
|-
| 
|align=left|Liberal Democratic Party of Moldova
|align="right"|13,367
|align="right"|26.29
|align="right"|+11.77
|-
| 
|align=left|Democratic Party of Moldova
|align="right"|7,473
|align="right"|14.70
|align="right"|+0.18
|-
| 
|align=left|Liberal Party
|align="right"|3,581
|align="right"|7.04
|align="right"|−5.92
|-
| 
|align=left|Party Alliance Our Moldova
|align="right"|1,866
|align="right"|3.67
|align="right"|−3.89
|-
|bgcolor=#0033cc|
|align=left|European Action Movement
|align="right"|763
|align="right"|1.50
|align="right"|+1.50
|-
|bgcolor="grey"|
|align=left|Other Party
|align="right"|2,295
|align="right"|4.48
|align="right"|-0.29
|-
|align=left style="background-color:#E9E9E9" colspan="2"|Total (turnout 58.44%)
|width="30" align="right" style="background-color:#E9E9E9"|51,241
|width="30" align="right" style="background-color:#E9E9E9"|100.00
|width="30" align="right" style="background-color:#E9E9E9"|

Culture
The district operates: houses and cultural centers – 62 units, amateur artistic groups with the honorary title "model" −28, museums – 3 units (Ungheni, Pirlita, Sculeni), public libraries – 51 units, a music school, a fine arts, a cinema, discotheques, sports halls work, fitness, pool.

Health
Medical institutions can be found by: hospitals – two units with 375 beds, health centers – 16 units, offices of family doctors – 24 units, pharmacies – 24 units, emergency medical assistance – one substation.

Tourism
 Aleksandr Nevski Church
 Museum of History and Ethnography Ungheni
 Nature reserve "Plaiul Fagului"
 Pirlita village museum
 Semeni medieval military fortress
 Trinity martyrs nation

Personalities
 I. A. L. Diamond – Comedy writer in Hollywood from the 1940–1980
 Gheorghe Papuc – Minister of Internal Affairs of Moldova in 2002–2009
 Samuel Cohen – Composer of the national anthem of Israel, Hatikvah
 Vasile Șoimaru – Economist, lecturer and journalist
 Vasile Vasilache – Writer

See also
Ungheni County

References

External links
Ungheni city site
Talk: District Ungheni
General description of the district Ungheni

 
Districts of Moldova